Jan Inge Hovig (11 May 1920 – 4 July 1977) was a Norwegian architect.

Hovig was born at Verran in  Nord-Trøndelag, Norway. He was the son of   Johannes Sigurd Hovig (1895-1953) and  Gudlaug Pauline Taugstad (1900-1969). Hovig finished his studies at the Norwegian Institute of Technology in 1946. He was city architect during the reconstruction of Narvik 1947–1950.  Narvik had been devastated  in  battle during 1940 as part of the Norwegian Campaign of the German invasion of Norway. In 1950 he moved to Oslo and founded his own office. In 1956 Hovig entered into a partnership with Christian Norberg-Schulz. From 1972 Hovig entered into a partnership with Helge B. Kvernes  in Porsgrunn.

Hovig represented Norway at the Architecture Exhibition during the 1968 Summer Olympics in Mexico City. Hovig's most notable work is the Arctic Cathedral (Tromsøysund kirke), which was drafted in 1960 and completed in 1965. The church is part of the Tromsøysund parish   in the Diocese of Nord-Hålogaland. It is now probably the city's most famous building.

Jan Inge Hovig married Norwegian television chef and author Ingrid Espelid Hovig in June 1977. Just one week after the wedding ceremony, he died of myocardial infarction. He was buried at Vestre gravlund in Oslo.

Notable works 
 1957 - Peace Chapel  (Fredskapellet) - Narvik
 1958 - Harstad Church (Harstad kyrkje).
 1961 - Tromsø Police Department (Troms politihus)
 1965 - Arctic Cathedral (Tromsøysund kirke)  in Tromsø.
 1965 - Alfheim Swimming Pool (Alfheim svømmehall) in Tromsø.
 1968 - Athletic Centre  (Idrettens hus)  in Narvik.

References

1920 births
1977 deaths
People from Verran
Modernist architects from Norway
Norwegian Institute of Technology alumni
20th-century Norwegian architects
Burials at Vestre gravlund